The Voyager Company was a pioneer in CD-ROM production in the 1980s and early 1990s. In partnership with Janus Films, the company published The Criterion Collection, a pioneering home video collection of classic and important contemporary films on LaserDisc. It was founded in 1984 by four partners: Jon Turell, Bill Becker, Aleen Stein, and Robert Stein in Santa Monica, California, and later moved to New York City. The firm took its name from the Voyager space craft.

In 1994, the partnership was diluted by selling 20% of it to the von Holzbrinck Publishing Group, a German holding company. In 1997, the Holzbrinck Group withdrew with its 20%, the name "Voyager," and half of the CD-ROM rights. Robert Stein took the other half of the CD-ROM rights and the Toolkit rights. This left the Criterion Collection in the possession of three of the original partners, each with a third: Aleen Stein, the Becker family, and the Turell family.

Releases

LaserDiscs
 De Italia
 The Great Quake of '89 (in partnership with ABC News Interactive)
 The National Gallery of Art
 Devo: The Complete Truth About De-Evolution
 The Residents: Twenty Twisted Questions  (Part 1/2)
 Louvre
 Theatre of the Imagination: Radio Stories by Orson Welles and The Mercury Theatre (1988)
 To New Horizons: Ephemeral Films 1931–1945
 The Vancouver Disc
 Vienna
 You Can't Get There From Here: Ephemeral Films 1945–1960
 The Voyager Videostack
 The Inland Sea
 Call It Home: The House That Private Enterprise Built

CD-ROMs
 A Hard Day's Night (Demo)
 A World Alive (Demo)
 All My Hummingbirds Have Alibis By Morton Subotnick (Demo)
 Amanda Stories (Demo)
 American Poetry The Nineteenth Century (Demo)
 Amnesty Interactive (Demo)
 Baseball's Greatest Hits (Demo)
 The Beat Experience
 The CD Companion to Beethoven's Ninth Symphony CD-ROM (Demo)
 The CD Companion To Mozart's Dissonant Quartet (Demo)
 The CD Companion to Dvorak The New World Symphony (Demo)
 The CD Companion to Stravinsky's "The Rite of Spring" (Demo)
 Cinema Volta – Weird Science & Childhood Memory
 Circus!: An Interactive Cartoon (Demo) 
 Comic Book Confidential (Demo)
 The Complete Maus (Demo)
 Count Down
 Criterion Goes to the Movies (Demo)
 The Day After Trinity (Demo)
 Dazzleoids
 Ephemeral Films 1931–1960 (incorporating two previously-released titles, To New Horizons and You Can't Get There From Here) (Demo)
 Exotic Japan – A Guide to Japanese Culture and Language by Nikki Yokokura
 First Emperor of China (Demo)
 First Person: "Defending Human Attributes in the Age of the Machine" Donald Norman, three Norman books and a number of technical papers (Demo)
 First Person: Mumia Abu-Jamal, Live from Death Row (Demo)
 First Person: The Society of Mind, starring Dr. Marvin Minsky (Demo)
 For All Mankind (Demo)
 If Monks Had Macs... (Demo)
 Invisible Universe, starring Dr. Fiorella Terenzi
 I Photograph To Remember / Fotografio Para Recordar
 Last Chance to See (Demo)
 Laurie Anderson's Puppet Motel (Clip)
 Macbeth (Demo)
 Mystery Science Theater 3000: The CD-ROM (Cancelled) 
 Our Secret Century: The Darker Side of the American Dream (12 discs, 2 unreleased, of films and collateral material from Prelinger Archives)
 Painters Painting (Demo)
 Planetary Taxi
 People Weekly – 20 Amazing Years Of Pop Culture (Demo)
 Poetry in Motion (Demo)
 Poetry in Motion II
 The Residents Freak Show (Demo)
 Rodney's Wonder Window
 Sacred and Secular: The Aerial Photography of Marilyn Bridges
 Salt of the Earth: A Film of Politics and Passion
 Shining Flower
 Silly Noisy House
 So I've Heard: A Collector's Guide to Compact Discs
 Stephen Jay Gould On Evolution (Demo)
 Theatre of the Imagination: Radio Stories by Orson Welles and the Mercury Theatre
 This Is Spinal Tap
 The Trout Quintet
 Truths & Fictions – A Journey from Documentary to Digital Photography
 Understanding McLuhan (Demo)
 With Open Eyes: Images from the Art Institute of Chicago
 The Voyager Audiostack

Floppy disks

Expanded Books series
 Jurassic Park – Crichton, Michael
 The Complete Hitch Hiker's Guide to the Galaxy – Adams, Douglas (EB2)
 The Complete Annotated Alice in Wonderland – Carroll, Lewis, Intro & notes by Gardner, Martin (EB1)
 Virtual Light – Gibson, William (EB52)
 Neuromancer / Count Zero / Mona Lisa Overdrive – Gibson, William (EB15)
 Zen and the Art of Motorcycle Maintenance and Lila: An Inquiry into Morals – Pirsig, Robert (EB8)
 Genius: The Life and Science of Richard Feynman – Gleick, James
 Who Built America
 A Wrinkle in Time, A Wind in the Door, A Swiftly Tilting Planet, and Many Waters – L'Engle, Madeleine
 The Complete Stories, Volume 1 – Asimov, Isaac
Invisible Man – Ellison, Ralph
The Society of Mind – Minsky, Marvin
Amusing Ourselves to Death – Postman, Neil and Brave New World - Huxley, Aldous
Of Mice and Men, Cannery Row, the Red Pony, The Pearl – Steinbeck, John (Floppy Disk)

References

History

Defunct software companies of the United States
LaserDisc
The Criterion Collection
Defunct manufacturing companies based in New York City
Defunct mass media companies of the United States